Raboon Tawfiq Maroof Khuder (born 1 July 1976) is an Iraqi Kurdish politician of the New Generation Movement. Maroof was born in Kirkuk, Iraq.

References

1976 births
Living people
Iraqi Kurdistani politicians
Kurdish people